Covington Municipal Airport may refer to:

 Covington Municipal Airport (Georgia) in Covington, Georgia, United States (FAA: 9A1)
 Covington Municipal Airport (Tennessee) in Covington, Tennessee, United States (FAA: M04)